In plant physiology, the Warburg effect is the decrease in the rate of photosynthesis due to high oxygen concentrations.  Oxygen is a competitive inhibitor of carbon dioxide fixation by RuBisCO which initiates photosynthesis.  Furthermore, oxygen stimulates photorespiration which reduces photosynthetic output. These two mechanisms working together are responsible for the Warburg effect.

References 

Photosynthesis